Buccaneer: The Pursuit of Infamy is a pirate video game developed by Stickman Studios and published by Blitz Arcade. It was released on December 6, 2008 for Microsoft Windows.

Gameplay
In Buccaneer: The Pursuit of Infamy, the player takes the role of captain of one of the pirate ships. The single-player mode consists of up to 50 missions that follow a captain rookie, who joins a group of pirates named the Golden Buccaneers.

Reception

On its release, Buccaneer: The Pursuit of Infamy was met with "mixed or average" reviews from critics, with an aggregate score of 68/100 on Metacritic.

References

External links
Official website

2008 video games
Windows games
Blitz Games Studios games
Windows-only games
Multiplayer and single-player video games
Video games about pirates